My Son Jeep is an American situation comedy originally broadcast on the NBC Radio and Television networks in 1953 (radio: January 25-June 14; television: July 4-September 22, with a "sneak preview" on June 3). Set in Grove Fall, USA, the program starred Martin Huston (later Bobby Alford) as Jeffrey "Jeep" Allison, a mischievous ten-year-old boy reminiscent of Dennis the Menace. Jeep was the younger of two children of Dr. Robert Allison, (Donald Cook and Paul McGrath on radio, Jeffrey Lynn on television), a widower and small-town doctor.

The program was later revived as a 15-minute weeknight program on the CBS Radio Network (October 3, 1955 – November 9, 1956).

External links

American comedy radio programs
1953 American television series debuts
1953 American television series endings
NBC original programming
1950s American sitcoms
Black-and-white American television shows
English-language television shows